Stop Space Return is the name of a Crazy Penis album produced in 2008. It is an update of the Australia-only album Love on the Line (see below), with four new tracks.

Track listing

"Stop Space Return"
"Lie Lost"
"Caught Up"
"Never Gonna Reach Me"
"In & Out"
"Love on the Line"
"Give a Little"
"Wishing For"
"Too Far"
"Fascination"
"Over to You"
"Say Goodbye"

The cover design was done by Richard Robinson.

Love on the Line
Love on the Line is the name of a Crazy Penis album produced in 2008, released only in Australia.

Track listing
"Too Far"
"Love on the Line"
"Fascination"
"Never Gonna Reach Me"
"Look Me Up"
"Give a Little"
"Is It Ever Enough?"
"Caught Up"
"Lie Lost"
"Say Goodbye"

2008 albums